Best of The Big Band is a compilation album from the American swing revival band The Brian Setzer Orchestra, released on 2002 in Japan only.

Track listing

 "Gettin' In The Mood"
 "Rumble In Brighton"
 "This Cat' s On A Hot Tin Roof"
 "Jump Jive An' Wail"
 "Sexy, Sexy"
 "Sleepwalk"
 "Stray Cat Strut"
 "Rock This Town"
 "The Dirty Boogie"
 "Brand New Cadillac"
 "Hoodoo Voodoo Doll"
 "Lady Luck"
 "Caravan"
 "Pennsylvania 6-5000"
 "Americano"
 "El Diablo"
 "Scatman Jack"
 "The House Is Rockin'"

References

2002 greatest hits albums
The Brian Setzer Orchestra albums